The Pentax Optio I-10 is a digital premium compact camera announced by Pentax on January 25, 2010. Its design is an example of retro-styling, based on the company's classic Auto 110 micro-SLRs. It is marked out as a premium compact by its inclusion of in-body image stabilisation, optional infra-red remote control, 720p video and dynamic range settings.

References
Notes

Bibliography
Pentax Optio I-10: Digital Photography Review

Pentax cameras
Cameras introduced in 2010